William Ivey Blair (July 14, 1911 - November 2, 1995) was an American stock car racing driver in the 1940s and the 1950s, and he was one of the pioneers of NASCAR.

Racing career
Blair started his racing career as a bootlegger in the 1930s. In 1939, he began racing at the newly-constructed High Point Speedway, and he opened his own track Tri-City Speedway after World War II.

Blair won three NASCAR Strictly Stock/Grand National races:

 June 18, 1950 – Blair piloted a 1950 Mercury owned by Sam Rice to victory in a race at Vernon Fairgrounds in Vernon, NY.
 April 20, 1952 – Blair drove a 1952 Oldsmobile owned by George Hutchens to his second win at Lakewood Speedway in Atlanta, GA.
 February 15, 1953 – In his final series victory, Blair drove his 1953 Oldsmobile to victory lane at the Beach & Road Course in Daytona Beach, FL.

Memorial
Blair, Jimmie Lewallen, and Fred Harb are the subject of the independent movie Red Dirt Rising" which is based on the book Red Dirt Tracks: The Forgotten Heroes of Early Stockcar Racing by Gail Cauble Gurley.

References

External links
 

1911 births
1995 deaths
NASCAR drivers
Sportspeople from High Point, North Carolina
Racing drivers from North Carolina